This is a chronological list of human spaceflights to the Salyut space stations. Prior to Salyut 6, flights were referred to by the designation of the Soyuz spacecraft that transported the crew to and from the station. Salyut commanders are listed in italics. "Duration" refers to the crew and does not always correspond to "Flight up" or "Flight down". Missions which failed to reach or dock with the station are listed in red. All cosmonauts are Soviet unless otherwise indicated.

The Salyut programme was a series of Soviet space stations launched during the 1970s and 1980s. Six Salyut space stations were crewed in addition to a number of prototypes and failures. Crewed flights as part of the Salyut programme ended in 1986 as efforts were shifted to Mir.

Salyut 1

Salyut 3

Salyut 4

Salyut 5

Salyut 6

Salyut 7

See also
 Salyut programme
 List of Salyut expeditions
 List of Salyut visitors
 List of Salyut spacewalks
 List of uncrewed spaceflights to Salyut space stations
 List of human spaceflights to Mir
 List of human spaceflights to the International Space Station

References

Salyut human spaceflights
Salyut program
Salyut